Dainius Šuliauskas (born 27 August 1973) is a retired Lithuanian football defender, who last played for FK Sūduva during his professional career. He obtained a total number of nine caps for the Lithuania national football team, scoring one goal.

Honours
Lithuania
Baltic Cup: 1991, 1997
Žalgiris Vilnius
A Lyga: 1991–92
Lithuanian Cup: 1992–93, 1993–94, 1996–97
FBK Kaunas
A Lyga: 1999

References

1973 births
Living people
Lithuanian footballers
Lithuania international footballers
Lithuanian expatriate footballers
FK Žalgiris players
FBK Kaunas footballers
GKS Bełchatów players
FK Inkaras Kaunas players
FK Sūduva Marijampolė players
FC Vilnius players
A Lyga players
Ekstraklasa players
Expatriate footballers in Poland
Lithuanian expatriate sportspeople in Poland
Association football defenders